Mahinahina is an unincorporated community and census-designated place on the island of Maui in Maui County, Hawaii, United States. Its population was 910 as of the 2020 census. The community is located on the west side of the island.

Geography

Demographics

References

Populated places on Maui
Unincorporated communities in Maui County, Hawaii
Unincorporated communities in Hawaii
Census-designated places in Maui County, Hawaii